These are the Billboard magazine Hot Dance Airplay number one hits of 2003.

Note that Billboard publishes charts with an issue date approximately 7–10 days in advance.  The chart was unpublished for the first ten weeks and featured 40 titles (it was on its eleventh week when it was included in Billboard'''s print and online editions), which means that its unofficial start date was August 16, 2003 (the unpublished chart and data would be included in 2018 after Billboard updated the website). Billboard'' made the chart listing official on October 25, 2003, with 25 titles, which would last until December 2014 when it returned to 40 titles.

See also
2003 in music
List of number-one dance singles of 2003 (U.S.)
List of Hot 100 number-one singles of 2003 (U.S.)

References

United States Dance Airplay
2003